A list of adventure films released in the 1940s.

1940

1941

1942

1943

1944

1945

1946

1947

1948

1949

Notes

1940s adventure films
1940s
Adventure